James Pleasants Jr. (October 24, 1769November 9, 1836) was an American politician who served in the U.S. Senate from 1819 to 1822 and was the 22nd Governor of Virginia from 1822 to 1825.

Biography
Pleasants was born at "Cold Comfort," in Goochland County (later separated as Powhatan County) in the Colony of Virginia on October 24, 1769. He pursued classical studies and graduated from the College of William and Mary, Williamsburg, Virginia. He studied law, was admitted to the bar, and commenced practice in Amelia County, Virginia in 1791.

Pleasants was the son of James Pleasants and Ann Randolph, the daughter of Isham Randolph of Dungeness and granddaughter of William Randolph. His sister was Susan.

Pleasants was a member of the Virginia House of Delegates 1797–1802 and clerk of the house of delegates 1803–1811. On January 30, 1811, he was appointed to the Court of Appeals but resigned almost immediately. Pleasants was elected as a Democratic-Republican to the Twelfth and the four succeeding Congresses and served from March 4, 1811, to December 14, 1819, when he resigned, having been elected a United States Senator. Pleasants served as chairman of the Committee on Public Expenditures (Thirteenth Congress), Committee on Expenditures in the Department of the Navy (Fifteenth Congress).

He was elected on December 10, 1819, as a Democrat-Republican to the United States Senate to fill the vacancy caused by the resignation of John W. Eppes and served from December 14, 1819, to December 15, 1822, when he resigned. He was chair of the Naval Affairs Committee (Sixteenth and Seventeenth Congresses). He was chosen as Governor of Virginia, serving 1822–1825. Pleasants was a delegate to the State constitutional conventions in 1829 and 1830. He retired and lived on his estate, "Contention," near Goochland, Goochland County, Virginia, where he died on November 9, 1836. He was buried on his estate. His brother-in-law and law partner, Eugene C. Massie, named his son James Pleasants Massie after Pleasants. The name has been handed down now to a total of four generations.

His son John Hampden Pleasants (1797–1846) founded the Richmond Whig newspaper, married twice, and later died in a duel with Thomas Ritchie, Jr.

Pleasants is the namesake of a residence hall at William and Mary. Pleasants County, West Virginia, was named after him in 1851.

References

External links
A Guide to the Governor James Pleasants Executive Papers, 1822–1825 at The Library of Virginia

1769 births
1836 deaths
College of William & Mary alumni
Governors of Virginia
United States senators from Virginia
Justices of the Supreme Court of Virginia
Virginia lawyers
Virginia state court judges
Democratic-Republican Party United States senators
Democratic-Republican Party members of the United States House of Representatives from Virginia
Democratic-Republican Party state governors of the United States
People from Washington County, Virginia
19th-century American politicians
18th-century American lawyers
19th-century American lawyers
19th-century American judges
People from Goochland County, Virginia
James